Eleanor of Anjou (August 1289 – 9 August 1341) was Queen of Sicily as the wife of King Frederick II of Sicily. She was a member of the Capetian House of Anjou by birth.

She was the third daughter of King Charles II of Naples and Mary of Hungary.

Eleanor was firstly married in 1299 to Philippe II de Toucy, son of Narjot de Toucy, Lord of Laterza, and Lucia of Tripoli. Their marriage was dissolved on 17 January 1300 by Pope Boniface VIII because they were related and had not sought permission from the pope to marry.

On 17 May 1302, Eleanor married secondly to the King of Sicily, Frederick II. Her father and her new husband had been engaged in a war for ascendancy in the Mediterranean Sea and especially Sicily and the Mezzogiorno. The marriage was part of a diplomatic effort to establish peaceful relations which would lead to the Peace of Caltabellotta (19 August 1302).

The peace divided the old Kingdom of Sicily into an island portion and a peninsular portion. The island, called the Kingdom of Trinacria, went to Frederick, who had been ruling it, and the Mezzogiorno, called the Kingdom of Sicily contemporaneously, but called the Kingdom of Naples by modern scholarship, went to Charles II, who had been ruling it. Thus, the peace was formal recognition of an uneasy status quo.

Eleanor and Frederick had nine children:
Peter II of Sicily (1304–1342), successor
Roger (born 1305), died young
Manfred, Duke of Athens and Neopatria (1306–1317), Duke of Athens and Neopatria
Constance, married on December 29, 1331 to Leo IV of Armenia
Elisabeth (1310–1349),(also known as Isabella), married (1328) Stephen II of Bavaria 
William, Prince of Taranto (1312–1338), Prince of Taranto, Duke of Athens and Neopatria
Giovanni di Randazzo (1317–1348), Duke of Randazzo, Duke of Athens and Neopatria, Regent of Sicily (from 1338)
Catherine (1320–1342)
Margaret (1331–1377), married (1348) Rudolf II of the Palatinate

Eleanor died on the 9 August 1341 at the Monastery of San Nicolo di Arena (Catania), she had been a widow since 1337. She was buried at a Franciscan monastery in Catania.

References

Sources

1289 births
1341 deaths
Capetian House of Anjou
Royal consorts of Sicily
14th-century Sicilian people
Princesses of Antioch
Daughters of kings
14th-century Italian women
Queen mothers